The Sky Phantom is the fifty-third volume in the Nancy Drew Mystery Stories series. It was first published in 1976 under the pseudonym Carolyn Keene. The actual author was ghostwriter Harriet Stratemeyer Adams.

Plot summary
Nancy goes to the Excello Flying School in the Midwest to take lessons while her friends Bess and George perfect their horse riding. At once, the young sleuth is confronted with the mystery of a hijacked plane and a missing pilot. Then the rancher's prize pony, Major is stolen. Nancy becomes a detective in a plane and on horseback to track down the elusive sky phantom and the horse thief. A lucky find – a medal with a message to be deciphered on it – furnishes a worthwhile clue. Romance is added when Bess becomes interested in a handsome cowboy. Readers will spur Nancy on as she investigates a strange magnetic cloud, hunts for the horse thief, and finally arrives at a surprising solution.

References

Nancy Drew books
1976 American novels
1976 children's books
Aviation novels
Grosset & Dunlap books
Children's mystery novels